Ruddington is a disused railway station on the Great Central Main Line south of Nottingham.
The line had branches that ran to the now decommissioned Ruddington Depot.

It was originally a standard GCR country island type station, like those surviving at Quorn and Woodhouse and Rothley, accessed from a road overbridge.  The station buildings have been demolished though the island platform still survives. Just south of the station is where the northern end of the northern preserved section of the GCRH starts. The station opened 15 March 1899 and closed to passengers on 4 March 1963, though passenger trains continued to pass through until closure of the line on 3 May 1969. Goods trains continued until the 1980s.

During WW2 a new railway station, Ruddington Factory Halt railway station, was constructed at Ruddington Depot

The Great Central Railway (Nottingham) have opened a station at Ruddington Fields on the site of the Ministry of Defence Depot and plan to purchase the station, restore it and extend the current preserved Great Central.

In March 2021, a bid was submitted to restore the Great Central Railway from Leicester to Ruddington as part of the third round of the Department for Transport Restoring Your Railway fund.

References

Disused railway stations in Nottinghamshire
Railway stations in Great Britain opened in 1899
Railway stations in Great Britain closed in 1963
Former Great Central Railway stations
Ruddington
Great Central Railway (preserved)